Water birth is labor and sometimes delivery that occurs in water, usually a birthing pool. The American College of Obstetricians and Gynecologists does not recommend birthing in water as the safety has not been determined. Proponents believe childbirth in water results in a more relaxed, less painful experience that promotes a midwife-led model of care. Critics argue that the safety of waterbirth has not been scientifically proven and that a wide range of adverse neonatal outcomes have been documented, including increased mother or child infections and the possibility of infant drowning. A 2018 Cochrane Review of water immersion in the first stages of labor found evidence of fewer epidurals and few adverse effects but insufficient information regarding giving birth in water.

Benefits

A moderate to weak level of evidence indicates that water immersion during the first stage of childbirth reduces the pain of labor.  A 2018 Cochrane Review found that immersion at this stage reduces the use of epidural analgesia; however, there is no clear evidence on the benefits of immersion for the second stage of labor, namely delivery (sometimes called full water birth). There is no evidence of increased adverse effects for immersion during the first or second stages of labor.

There is not strong evidence that a water birth reduces tearing or perineal trauma. Water birth may offer perineal support for a birthing mother, and some theorize that this may decrease the risk of tearing and reduce the use of episiotomy.

A 2014 review reported that water immersion during the first stage of labor can reduce the length of that stage, labor pain, and the use of epidural or spinal analgesia. It is also associated with a lower rate of cesarean delivery and stress urinary incontinence symptoms 42 days after delivery.  The review reported that immersion during labor did not appear to increase the rate of infections for the mother or the baby, and APGAR scores for the newborn infant were similar to those of conventional births.

Risks and concerns

The British Royal College of Obstetricians and Gynaecologists and the Royal College of Midwives issued a joint statement in 2006 supporting water birth for healthy women with uncomplicated pregnancies but does not recommend it in cases of complications.

In a 2005 commentary, the Committee on Fetus and Newborn of the American Academy of Pediatrics (AAP) released an analysis of the scientific literature regarding underwater births. The Committee noted several positive studies for underwater birth but went on to criticize them for lacking proper scientific controls, a significant number of infant deaths and diseases, and the general lack of information to support the use of water births. The paper concluded:

The AAP received numerous letters in response to the statement, many claiming passionately that water birth had strong benefits and minimal risks for both parents and children and criticizing the AAP for failing to publish positive studies about the practice. In response, an author of the statement noted that the claims made were unsubstantiated and based purely on anecdotal evidence, with no randomized controlled trials (RCTs) that would allow an evidence-based assessment of the safety and benefits of water births. The author concluded by urging for proponents to support such a trial so that the question could be answered. The editor of the journal Pediatrics, where the commentary was published, noted that no such trials had ever been submitted to the journal, which had a policy against publishing articles that are not based on scientific evidence. The reply concluded that "I have not received any science-based commentaries from the groups that you cite in your letter. We cannot publish every letter, based on opinions only, that we receive."

Water births 
Most hospitals do not accommodate water births because of the added risks involved. Although there is moderate to weak evidence that water births lessen pain without the need for an epidural, there are no medical proven reasons why an expecting mother would need a water birth. Furthermore, there is an added liability of hospital water birth because of the inability to see what complications could potentially be happening from underwater. Therefore, the majority of water births are done at home. However, there are some hospitals that do still offer alternative birthing suites for families that want to do a water birth.

Birth pool
A birth pool is a specially designed vessel containing water for women to immerse themselves in for pain relief during labor.  Birth pools work on the same principle as a bathtub, but are distinct from them due to buoyancy and freedom of movement, factors deemed to be important in labor. A birth pool can either be permanently installed or portable. Getting into a pool of water for labor is often called water birth because some women choose to remain in the water for birth as well.

Health policy in England stipulates women should be given the opportunity to labor in water through the publication of Intrapartum care guidelines issued in 2007 by the National Institute for Health and Care Excellence (NICE).  The Royal College of Obstetricians and Gynaecologists and the Royal College of Midwives have jointly supported labor and birthing in water, and encourage hospitals to ensure birth pools are available to all women.

Characteristics 
Before birth pools became readily available there were many stories of women laboring and birthing in re-purposed tub-like products including animal watering troughs.

Ordinary bathtubs found in American and British homes do not provide enough room for women to comfortably move and try different positions in labour, such as squatting or kneeling, and are not deep enough to create buoyancy.  In order to create the feeling of weightlessness through buoyancy, it is necessary for the water to almost cover the women's breasts while she is sitting and should cover her belly while she is squatting, leaning over the side of the pool or kneeling upright in the pool sitting back on her heels.

References 

Childbirth
Midwifery
Obstetrics
Maternity in the United Kingdom
Water
Pain management